Luzy may refer to:

People
 Angelo und Luzy
 
 Mademoiselle Luzy (1747–1830), French stage actress

Places
 Luzy, Nièvre, France
 Luzy-Saint-Martin, France
 Luzy-sur-Marne, France